Chen Zhangliang (born February 3, 1961, Fuqing, Fujian) graduated from the South China College of Tropical Crops (now Hainan University) in 1983, and then was sent to study in the United States by the Chinese Government. He finished his Ph.D. in Washington University in St. Louis. After he returned to China in 1987, he worked in Peking University as dean of faculty of biology and chair of school of life science. He became the vice president of Peking University in 1995, and president of China Agricultural University in 2002.

He became vice-governor of Guangxi in 2007.

References 

1961 births
Living people
Scientists from Fujian
Politicians from Fuzhou
People's Republic of China politicians from Fujian
Academic staff of Peking University
Academic staff of China Agricultural University
Presidents of China Agricultural University
People from Fuqing
Educators from Fujian
Hainan University alumni
Washington University in St. Louis alumni